Yisrael Eichler (born 27 March 1955) is an Israeli politician. A member of Agudat Yisrael, he served as a member of the Knesset for the party and the United Torah Judaism alliance from 2003 until 2005, and again since 2011.

Biography
Born in Jerusalem, Eichler worked as an author and journalist. He became editor of the Haredi newspaper HaMahane HaHaredi in 1980, and in 1996 he became chairman of the Centre for Jewish Publicity.

In 2003, he was elected to the Knesset on the United Torah Judaism list, an alliance of Agudat Yisrael and Degel HaTorah. The alliance split in January 2005 and Eichler resigned from the Knesset on 23 February that year; his seat was taken by Shmuel Halpert.

As part of a seat rotation agreement within United Torah Judaism, Eichler returned to the Knesset on 6 February 2011 as a replacement for Meir Porush. He served as parliamentary group chairman until 2013. He was re-elected in the 2013 elections, and was placed sixth on the UTJ list for the 2015 elections, retaining his seat again as the party won six seats. Following a Supreme Court ruling that public mikveh facilities must allow use by followers of Conservative and Reform Judaism in February 2016, he compared non-Orthodox Jews to the "mentally ill".

Personal
Eichler is married and has 14 children. He lives in Jerusalem.

References

External links

1955 births
Living people
Agudat Yisrael politicians
Deputy Speakers of the Knesset
Israeli Ashkenazi Jews
Israeli journalists
Israeli Orthodox Jews
Jewish Israeli politicians
Members of the 16th Knesset (2003–2006)
Members of the 18th Knesset (2009–2013)
Members of the 19th Knesset (2013–2015)
Members of the 20th Knesset (2015–2019)
Members of the 21st Knesset (2019)
Members of the 22nd Knesset (2019–2020)
Members of the 23rd Knesset (2020–2021)
Members of the 24th Knesset (2021–2022)
Members of the 25th Knesset (2022–)
Politicians from Jerusalem
United Torah Judaism politicians
Yiddish-speaking people